Makayla Gerken Schofield (born 4 June 1999) is a British freestyle skier who competes internationally.

She competed in the FIS Freestyle Ski and Snowboarding World Championships 2021, where she placed seventeenth in women's moguls, and thirteenth in women's dual moguls.

Gerken Schofield is pansexual and in 2021 helped her sport's governing body GB Snowsport to mark LGBT+ History Month.

References

1999 births
Living people
British female freestyle skiers
Freestyle skiers at the 2022 Winter Olympics
Olympic freestyle skiers of Great Britain
LGBT skiers
British LGBT sportspeople
Lesbian sportswomen